Nicholas Alexander Law (born 29 March 1988) is an English professional footballer who plays as a midfielder for MLS Next Pro club Huntsville City, where he is also an assistant coach. He is the son of football manager and former player Nicky Law, Sr.

Law began his career with Sheffield United, however he failed to make a significant breakthrough into the first team and had loan spells with Yeovil Town and twice at Bradford City. In 2009, he was given a free transfer joining Rotherham United and later moved to Scotland to join Scottish Premier League side Motherwell. Whilst with Motherwell Law was named in the PFA Scotland Team of the Year for season 2012–13 and the following summer joined Rangers.

Club career

Sheffield United
Law was born in Plymouth, Devon. A member of Sheffield United's academy, he was given a squad number despite only being expected to play in the reserves and Under-18's. However, he made his first team debut as a 58th minute substitute for Colin Marrison in the League Cup against Reading on 25 October 2005. A few weeks later, on 16 November 2005, Law signed a two-year contract with the club.

One year on, but this on 18 October 2006, Law signed a two-year contract extension which will keep him at Sheffield United until 2009. Law made his Premier League debut for the Blades as a 90th-minute substitute against Newcastle United on 4 November 2006. and made his home league debut as week later, as a substitute against Bolton Wanderers at Bramall Lane the following week. He made four Premier League appearances during the 2006–07 season.

Law had to wait until his third senior season to score his first goal for the Blades coming in a second round League Cup tie at MK Dons on 28 August 2007. After his loan spell with Bradford City came to an end, Law played his first match, when he went on as a substitute in the 89th minute, in a 3–0 win over Leicester City. In July 2008, Law then went on a trial with Cheltenham Town.

Yeovil Town
In February 2006, Law joined Yeovil Town on a month's loan, later extended to two months playing six times whilst at Huish Park. Having made six appearances for the club so far, Law had loan extended with Yeovil Town for another month. However, ten days later, Law was recalled by his parent club.

Bradford City
He subsequently signed on loan for Bradford City on 5 October after being recommended to the club by his father and former City manager Nicky Law. He scored his first career league goals when he scored twice in the final minutes of Bradford's 4–1 victory over Dagenham & Redbridge on 17 November 2007. He returned to Sheffield United after two months opting to fight for a first team place in the Championship.

In October 2008, Law was again signed on loan at Bradford City, as cover for Joe Colbeck, who was injured in a victory against Grimsby Town. His first game during his second spell was a day later and ended in a 1–0 victory against Bury at Valley Parade, with Law nearly scoring in the first half. He scored the first goal of his second spell in his fifth game to give City a 2–0 victory against Rotherham United at the Don Valley Stadium on 22 November With City suffering a number of injuries to midfielder's, Law's loan deal was extended until the New Year and another time until the end of the season.

Law returned to Bramall Lane at the end of the season having made 29 appearances for the Bantams but was placed on the transfer list as Sheffield United sought to trim their squad.

Rotherham United
In June 2009, despite interest from both League One and League Two clubs, Law signed a two-year deal with Rotherham United. He left Bramall Lane on a free transfer but with the Blades retaining a 50% sell on clause. Law joined Rotherham United, rather than Bradford City, but stated not joining Bradford was one of the toughest calls to make. However, Law did believe that joining Rotherham United would be the best move for him at that point in his career.

Law went immediately into Rotherham's first team after impressing in pre-season, making a huge impact to the squad and endearing himself with the fans. Consistent outstanding performances throughout the first month of the season brought much praise and attention to the young midfielder. Sky Sports pundits commented that he could "easily play in the championship, if not higher." On the strength of this, Middlesbrough reportedly placed a late deadline day bid, but this was rejected by Rotherham. After topping the list of assists in League Two consistently since the start of the season, Law scored his first goal for Rotherham on 26 September against Barnet. By January, Rotherham turned down another bid for Law, this time a £150,000 offer from Championship side Blackpool. Though the bid was turned down, Manager Ian Holloway, himself, says the club kept himself distance from signing Law. In his first season, Law, along with two other Rotherham United's player, Ian Sharps and Adam Le Fondre, named the 2009–10 Football League Two Team of the Year.

In 2010–11 season, Law starts his season in a match against Cheltenham Town, where he provided four assists, in a 6–4 win and scored his first goal of the season, in a 1–1 draw against Stevenage. Then, on 26 February 2011, Law made a hat-trick of assists, in a 4–2 win over Burton Albion.

Law continued to impress in the 2010–11 season and still do the same thing by topping the list of assists in League Two consistently since the start of the season, which Law was, once again, named the 2009–10 Football League Two Team of the Year, becoming the second member to be named, in the previous season, for the PFA Team of the year in the second consecutive in a row.
At the end of the 2010–11 season, Law was among six players to be offered a new contract. But as his contract is about to expire, Law attracted interests clubs from England and Scotland, like Scunthorpe United. Manager Andy Scott says he optimistic for Law to stay at the club, but soon admits Scott gave his best effort to keep Law.

Motherwell
On 1 July 2011, Law joined SPL side Motherwell on a free transfer, joining up with Stuart McCall, who was his manager at Bradford City in 2008.

Law made his debut, on the opening game of the season, where he provided an assist for Jamie Murphy, in a 3–0 win over Inverness CT, and described it as a "perfect debut" On 24 August 2011, he scored his first Motherwell goal in a 4–0 League Cup win over Clyde. On 24 January 2012, Law scored his first league goal, in a 3–1 win against Dunfermline Athletic. Law finished the season with seven goals in forty-three appearances in all competitions. Motherwell finished in third place, and following Rangers administration, which meant they couldn't play in UEFA competitions Motherwell qualified for the Champions League.

In 2012–13 season, Law played his first European match, the Champions League third qualifying round against Greek side Panathinaikos, but the Greek side proved to be too strong and Motherwell failed to win either legs losing 2–0 and 3–0 respectively. Despite the loss, Law spoke of his debut, saying: "It was classic European football, particularly Champions League". In the summer transfer window, Law was the subject of a bid from a League One club, which was rejected. Having made six appearances so far in the season, Law scored his first goal, in a 3–3 draw against Aberdeen on 23 September 2012 and then, on 18 November 2012, made a hat-trick of assists, in a 3–1 win over Inverness CT. Then, on 27 February 2013, Law provided a double assist, in a 2–1 win over Celtic. A week later, on 30 March 2013, Law scored a brace, in a 3–0 win against Dundee. After a run of good performances, Law was awarded March's Scottish Premier League player of the month. At the end of the 2012–13 season, Law, alongside teammates Shaun Hutchinson, Darren Randolph and Michael Higdon, was named in the PFA Scotland Team of the Year 2012–13. At the end of the season, the club finished in second place behind Celtic, meaning they qualified for Europe for the second season running.

With his contract set to expire at the end of the 2012–13 season, Law had attracted interest from Rangers. In early April, Law was  among the players who were offered a new contract by Motherwell. Law said he might stay with the club, but will wait until the season ends before making a decision. On 10 May 2013, Stuart McCall said that Law, along with Randolph, would be leaving the club on a free transfer. Four days later, on 14 May 2013, Law confirmed that he's in talks with Rangers.

Rangers
On 24 May 2013, Law agreed to join Rangers on a free transfer, when the Glasgow club's transfer ban is lifted on 1 September. Upon the move, Law stated joining Rangers as "It was impossible for me to turn down. It was probably a once-in-a-lifetime offer for me to sign here." Law went on to say Ally McCoist's tears and passion persuaded him to join the club. In January 2014, Manager McCoist said he didn't have any regrets about signing players in the summer, Law being among them, despite a deterioration of the financial situation at Rangers.

Law scored two goals on his debut, playing as a trialist, in a Challenge Cup win over Albion Rovers. After the match, manager Ally McCoist praised Law's performance in the match. On 10 August 2013, Law played his first League match for Rangers against Brechin City, scoring one goal in a 4–1 victory and providing a double assist for Chris Hegarty for the first goal and Dean Shiels for the fourth goal. Since joining Rangers, manager McCoist says Law is responsible for helping the club by bringing "real calmness" and "an attacking edge". In the club's second game of 2014, Law scored a brace, as Rangers won 2–0 against Stenhousemuir on 5 January 2014. At the conclusion of the winter transfer, Manager McCoist revealed an English club had attempted to sign Law, only the bid was to be rejected, as it was felt the bidding club tried to take advantage of Rangers' financial problem, which turned out to be Blackpool. Law started for Rangers in the 1–0 loss to Raith Rovers in the 2014 Challenge Cup Final, where he missed a number of chances. In the 2014–15 season Law was the highest scoring Rangers player in the league with 13 goals.

Under new manager Mark Warburton, Law made a strong start to the 2015–16 season and scored a goal in a 3–0 victory over Livingston on 12 September 2015. After two months out due to injury, Law returned to the Rangers starting eleven against Hibernian in late December, however his performances since the injury, were not consistent, or good enough to secure a new contract and he was released by Rangers in May 2016.

Bradford City
Law re-signed for Bradford on 29 June 2016.

He was released by Bradford City at the end of the 2017–18 season.

Exeter City
Law joined League Two side Exeter City on 2 July 2018. He immediately became a fan favourite, scoring on his debut against Carlisle United and netting many other crucial goals against the likes of MK Dons and Notts County. Nicky scored 10 goals from midfield and notched numerous assists in his first season, collecting 6 awards in the end-of-season awards ceremony.

He performed similarly well in 2019/20, scoring 7 goals and recording 7 assists at the point of the season being suspended. He started in all three games of Exeter's playoff campaign, which ended in defeat at Wembley to Northampton Town.

At the start of the 2020/21 season, Nicky switched from the number 8 shirt to the number 7, vacated by Lee Martin in the summer. He did not play as regularly this season due to the form of younger player, Matt Jay, who played in a similar position to Law. Despite this, Law still scored some crucial goals in his appearances, such as an equaliser (as well as two assists) against League One Gillingham in the second round of the FA Cup. After he captained the club in a 1–0 loss to Carlisle United on 30 January 2021, it was announced that Nicky had the permission of the manager and the board to leave the club before his contract expired, as he had received an offer to join American side Indy Eleven as a player-coach. His final day at the club would be January 31, 2021.

Indy Eleven
On 30 January 2021, it was announced that Law would join USL Championship side Indy Eleven ahead of their 2021 season.

Tampa Bay Rowdies
On 21 July 2022, Law was transferred to USL Championship side Tampa Bay Rowdies in exchange for Juan Tejada. Law and the Rowdies mutually agreed to part way on 4 January 2023.

Huntsville City
On 18 January 2023, Law joined MLS Next Pro expansion club Huntsville  as a player-coach.

International career
Law represented England at youth international level.

Personal life
Law revealed that Stuart McCall is the biggest influence on his career and a massive help. His brother Josh Law is also a professional footballer. 
Nicky grew up in the village of Old Tupton in North East Derbyshire, Tupton Hall is situated about four miles from Chesterfield. Law also studied at Tupton Primary School and Tupton Hall School, during the latter years of his secondary education he was in the Sheffield United academy alongside fellow professional footballer Lloyd Kerry (now of Harrogate Town FC).

Career statistics

Club

Honours
Rangers
Scottish Championship: 2015–16
Scottish League One: 2013–14
Scottish Challenge Cup: 2015–16

Individual
PFA Team of the Year: 2009–10 Football League Two, 2010–11 Football League Two
PFA Scotland Team of the Year 2012–13
SPL Player of the Month: March 2013

References

External links
 
 

1988 births
Living people
Footballers from Plymouth, Devon
English footballers
England youth international footballers
Association football midfielders
Sheffield United F.C. players
Yeovil Town F.C. players
Bradford City A.F.C. players
Rotherham United F.C. players
Motherwell F.C. players
Rangers F.C. players
Exeter City F.C. players
Indy Eleven players
Tampa Bay Rowdies players
Premier League players
English Football League players
Scottish Premier League players
Scottish Professional Football League players
USL Championship players
Nashville SC non-playing staff
English expatriate footballers
Expatriate soccer players in the United States
English expatriate sportspeople in the United States